Tudor Aaron Istodor (born 24 May 1984, sometimes credited as Tudor Istodor) is a Romanian actor.  He played Dinu Caragea in the Romanian police drama Băieți buni.

Istodor is the son of Romanian actors Claudiu Istodor and Maia Morgenstern.  He mostly focuses his career by performing theatre.

Movies

Tudor Istodor starred different characters in movies, short films or TV series.
The Fixer (2016)
Cadences obstinées (2014)
Miss Christina (2013)
Luna verde – 2010
Cendres et sang / Cenuşă şi sânge – 2009
Weekend with my Mother – 2009
Târziu – 2008 (short)
Blood and Chocolate / Pasiune şi destin (2007)
Bricostory – 2007 (short)
Interior. Scară de bloc (2007)
Radu+Ana – 2007 (short)
Sinopsis docu-dramă – 2007 (short)
Tarziu – 2007 (short)
Cu inima indoita – 2006 (TV movie)
Examen – 2006 (short)
The Paper Will Be Blue  – 2006
Lombarzilor 8 -2006 (TV series)
Tertium non datur – 2006 (short)
Băieți buni – 2005 (TV series)

External links 
 Tudor Aaron Istodor – Profile (Romanian)
 Lombarzilor 8 – TV Series

Living people
1984 births
Romanian Jews